WBCA may refer to:

 Washington's Birthday Celebration
 Women's Basketball Coaches Association
 West Bengal Chess Association
 WBCA-LP, a low-power radio station (102.9 FM) licensed to serve Boston, Massachusetts, United States
 WBCA (Schenectady, New York), a radio station (101.1 FM) which was deleted in 1952
 WTOF a Bay Minette, Alabama radio station (1110 AM) which held the WBCA call sign from 1957–2006
 Wild Bird Conservation Act